The Ansar were a group of people consisting of three or four tribes, living in Madinah, who gave aid and protection to prophet Mohammed and his followers. This help came about after they suffered years of hardships and torture at the hands of the locals of Makkah.

Origin

The Anṣâr were recruited mostly from Mesopotamia and Arabia. They were the most important elements in the later Islamic campaigns against both the Sassanid and Byzantine Empires.

The Muslim inhabitants of Medina who welcomed Muhammad and the other Meccan Muslims when they migrated to Medina from Mecca (in an event known as the Hijra) are also known as Anṣâr. The Sahabas, or companions of Muhammad, are divided into two categories; of Muhajirun, people who fled from Mecca; and the Anṣâr, those who welcomed and took in the Muhajirun. The Anṣâr are vital to Islamic history because they took the fledgling Muslim community in and joined it themselves, turning Islam into a city-state power. In Medina, each Anṣâr family took in a member of the Muhajirun and offered them a place to stay and protection.

Known for their piety and courage, some famous Anṣârs are Muath bin Jabal Al-anṣâri and Sa'ad bin Ubaadah, Sa'ad's great great grandchildren were the Nasrids kings of Granada in Spain from the 13th century to the 15th century.

In the 19th century the term was associated with the followers of the Mahdi and Osman Digna in the Sudan who fought against Anglo-Egyptian forces in a series of wars at the close of the century. Ansar is the name of the Sufi sect of disciples of the Mahdi.

Various political and military groupings in Arab and Muslim countries continue to use the name up to the present, seeking to emulate the famed ancient warriors.

Bangladesh Ansar

Bangladesh Ansar is a para-military organization of Village Guards in Bangladesh. Mostly a voluntary force, it recruits mainly from farmers and artisans and its main objective is to aid the Regular Armed Forces and Police Force in War, insurgency or anti-crime drives.

References 

Cavalry
Infantry
Military history of Islam

ca:Ansar
fr:Ansar
it:Ansar